Viktor Ivanovich Kostyrko (born May 24, 1948) is the mayor of Tiraspol, the capital of the de facto independent Pridnestrovian Moldavian Republic (PMR). He was born in Komsomolsk-on-Amur   and is of Ukrainian ethnicity.  Originally elected in 1999, he has since been re-elected once.

Viktor Kostyrko is a political ally of the PMR's president, Igor Smirnov.

References

External links
 City of Tiraspol, official website

1948 births
Living people
People from Komsomolsk-on-Amur
Transnistrian politicians